The Kenya Trade Network Agency (KenTrade) is a state corporation established by the National Government of Kenya to facilitate trade logistics in the Republic of Kenya.

History 
The agency was established through a Legal Notice issued by the government of Kenya in January 2011, for the purpose of promoting efficient administration and logistics of both local and international trade. 

The agency achieved this through the establishment of the country's first National Electronic Single Window System, which serves as a single point of all trade transactions such as approvals, cargo clearance and payment of requisite taxes and duties on imports and exports. The system serves as a single trade facilitation link between government ministries and agencies involved in trade, such as the Ministry of the National Treasury & Planning and the Kenya Revenue Authority, and local and international traders.

The single link has improved the speed and ease of carrying out trade in the country, as the process of trade transactions has been simplified by removing the time-consuming and costly process of visiting numerous government agencies to commence trade transactions by unifying all the requisite processes into the Single Window System.

In July 2022, the National Electronic Single Window System Act was enacted to give the agency's existence and objectives a clearer and more precise legal foundation.

Location 
The headquarters of KenTrade is located in the capital city of Nairobi, at Embankment Plaza in the Upper Hill area of Nairobi.

See also 

 Ministry of Industrialization, Trade and Enterprise Development

References 

Government agencies in Africa
Government agencies of Kenya